Rebecca Field married name Rebecca Willgress is an English international lawn & indoor bowls player. Field was the 2013 World Indoor singles champion.

Personal life 
Field starting playing bowls at the age of eight, in her local village hall in York, giving the short mat game a go. She was attracted to the sport following a big drive in the 1990s to get people playing indoor bowls in their communities. Subsequent moves to Boston, Lincolnshire with her family and then to study at the University of East Anglia in Norwich only increased her appetite for the game. Field has language degrees in French and Spanish and currently works for a Norwich-based marketing firm.

Field is a supporter of the Championship team Norwich City Football Club.

Bowls career

Indoors
Field plays and competes for the Norfolk Bowling Club in Norwich. She competed as a junior (U25) international player for several years and won multiple titles. Amongst her accomplishments as a junior, is being a two-time English and British Isles indoor singles champion.

Field first competed for the England senior ladies team at indoor level in 2011, when she was named in the squad for the BIWIBC International Series. Field competed at her first World Indoor Championships in 2012 in the ladies singles event. Organisers invited Field to the competition after being impressed with her recent rise in the sport.

Field reached her first World Indoor Bowls ladies singles final in 2013, defeating Alison Merrien in a tie-break set becoming the youngest ever winner of the event at 23. The victory gained Field a wild card entry into the WBT International Open and direct qualification for the World Indoor Championships in 2014, where she was beaten by 18-year-old Katherine Rednall in the final.

Field was twice runner-up in the 2016 World Indoor Bowls Championship and 2018 World Indoor Bowls Championship losing to Ellen Falkner and Katherine Rednall respectively.

Outdoors
Field won her first outdoor titles, winning the ladies two-wood singles and junior pairs events at the National Championships in 2014. She first competed for the England senior ladies team at outdoor level in 2015, when she was named in the squad for BWIBC International Series.
Also at outdoor level in 2015, Field was selected to represent England at the European Team Championships and Atlantic Rim Games. She won gold in the ladies pairs, mixed fours and team events at the European Team Championships.

In 2018 she finished runner-up to Amy Gowshall in the National Two Wood Singles.

Titles and finals 

1The Gedling Trophy is awarded to the best overall performing nation.

Awards 
Norwich Sportsperson of the Year (2013)

Personal life
Her husband is England international Wayne Willgress.

References 

Living people
Alumni of the University of East Anglia
English female bowls players
Indoor Bowls World Champions
1990 births
Bowls European Champions